This is a list of the largest cosmic structures so far discovered. The unit of measurement used is the light-year (distance traveled by light in one Julian year; approximately 9.46 trillion kilometres).

This list includes superclusters, galaxy filaments and large quasar groups (LQGs). The list characterizes each structure based on its longest dimension.

Note that this list refers only to coupling of matter with defined limits, and not the coupling of matter in general (as per example the cosmic microwave background, which fills the entire universe). All structures in this list are defined as to whether their presiding limits have been identified.

There are some reasons to be cautious about this list:

The Zone of Avoidance, or the part of the sky occupied by the Milky Way, blocks out light to several structures, making their limits imprecisely identified.
Some structures are too distant to be seen even with the most powerful telescopes. 
Some structures have no defined limits, or endpoints. All structures are believed to be part of the cosmic web, which is a conclusive idea. Most structures are overlapped by nearby galaxies, creating a problem of how to carefully define the structure's limit.
Interpreting the observational data requires assumptions about gravitational lensing, redshift, etc.



List of largest structures

List of largest voids

Voids are immense spaces between galaxy filaments and other large-scale structures. Technically they are not structures. They are vast spaces which contain very few or no galaxies. They are theorized to be caused by quantum fluctuations during the early formation of the universe.

A list of the largest voids so far discovered is below. Each is ranked according to its longest dimension.

See also

References

Structures, largest
Largest structures
cosmic structures